Rushden is a town in Northamptonshire, England.

Rushden may also refer to:
 Rushden, Hertfordshire, England, a village
 Rushden railway station in the Northamptonshire town
 Max Rushden (born 1979), English radio and television presenter

See also
 Rushton (disambiguation)